Arkys cornutus, the horned triangular spider, is a common Australian spider belonging to the family Arkyidae.

An ambush hunter, commonly found resting on leaves and fern. The front two pairs of legs are large and spined, suited for grabbing small insects, while the rear pairs of legs are smaller. Body colour varies from yellow or orange to red with pale spots on the heart shaped abdomen.

References

Araneomorphae
Spiders of Australia
Spiders described in 1872